Richard Douglas Berrington (born 3 April 1987) is a Scottish cricketer. He played for Scotland in the 2006 Under-19 Cricket World Cup in Sri Lanka, and has since played first-class, One Day International, and List A cricket for Scotland. In June 2022, Berrington was named as the captain of the national team, after Kyle Coetzer stepped down from leading the side.

Early life and youth career
Berrington was born in Pretoria, South Africa, but he emigrated to Scotland as a child. Berrington played cricket for Scotland at a national level as a teenager, representing the country at every level from under-13s up to under-19s. He was so skilled that while he was still eligible to play under-17s cricket, he was already playing for Scotland's under-19 team. As an 18-year-old, he went to India as part of the European Cricket Council Development team, and he was also part of the International Cricket Council's first Winter Training Camp in Pretoria. Following this, he was part of Scotland's squad for the 2006 Under-19 Cricket World Cup in Sri Lanka.

International career
Berrington progressed through the Scottish A team and then made his One Day International debut for Scotland against Ireland in July 2008, hitting the winning runs for Scotland. He played in his first Twenty20 International, also against Ireland, the next month. Berrington became a regular member of the Scottish team, being particularly effective in Twenty20s and first-class cricket, and he was part of their squad to play in the 2009 ICC World Twenty20. After being on a seasonal contract between April and September 2009, he became the sixth Scottish cricketer to be given a full-time contract with Cricket Scotland in March 2010 as part of Scotland's efforts to increase professionalism in their national team.

Berrington has scored centuries in a number of key matches for Scotland, but he was frustratingly inconsistent. In June 2010, in a match against India A, Berrington scored 106 to help Scotland recover from 7/64 to score the required 277 runs, causing a major upset. In July 2011 he scored 56 runs in just 23 balls in an ODI to help Scotland win their largest ever successful run chase, which years later Scottish captain Preston Mommsen would refer to as his most memorable innings. Next he scored 100 runs off 56 balls in a Twenty20 International on 24 July 2012 against Bangladesh, which Scotland won by 34 runs. This made Berrington just the seventh cricketer to score a century in a Twenty20 International, the first from an associate nation, and it gave Scotland their first ever win against a full member of the ICC. Berrington's ton won the match almost single-handedly for Scotland, as none of the other Scottish batsmen scored more than 19 runs. He scored his maiden century in ODIs against Ireland in September 2014, ensuring his place in Scotland's team for the 2015 Cricket World Cup, albeit in a losing cause.

In Scotland's opening match of the 2015 World Cup against host nation New Zealand, Berrington scored 50 runs as part of a large partnership with Matt Machan, who also scored a half-century, but it was the only substantial partnership of the innings and Scotland were bowled out for 142, which New Zealand chased down with more than half of their overs remaining. This was Berrington's highest score of the World Cup. While bowling during Scotland's group match against Sri Lanka, Berrington's shoe disintegrated as he took his delivery stride in one ball.

In a 2016 ODI match against the United Arab Emirates, Berrington passed 1,000 ODI runs. In the same match, Preston Mommsen and Kyle Coetzer both passed 1,000 runs as well. Previously, only two Scottish cricketers had achieved this milestone. In January 2017, Berrington and Calum MacLeod were part of a record 127-run partnership, the highest ever T20I partnership for Scotland, in a match against Hong Kong, with Berrington's orthodox style combining well with MacLeod's unorthodox strokeplay. He made his career-best List A score of 110 against Namibia in June 2017. Berrington also captained his first international matches for Scotland in January 2018 during the 2017–18 United Arab Emirates Tri-Nation Series. Scottish captain Kyle Coetzer was unavailable for the first two matches as he was completing coaching qualifications, so Berrington stood in as captain for Scotland's first two matches against Ireland.

Berrington played for Scotland in the 2018 Cricket World Cup Qualifier. He scored a half-century in Scotland's opening-day upset win against Afghanistan as part of a national record 208-run third-wicket partnership with Calum MacLeod, and he scored 47 runs in Scotland's thrilling tie with Zimbabwe. In Scotland's final match, with Scotland needing to beat the West Indies to qualify for the 2019 Cricket World Cup, Berrington was controversially dismissed leg before wicket. Replays showed that the ball hit Berrington outside the line of off stump, meaning he should not have been given out. As the tournament was not making use of the Umpire Decision Review System to save on costs, Scotland were unable to challenge the call. Scotland lost by just four runs under the Duckworth–Lewis–Stern method, but had they lost one less wicket they would have won.

In September 2019, he was named in Scotland's squad for the 2019 ICC T20 World Cup Qualifier tournament in the United Arab Emirates. In November 2020, Berrington was nominated for the ICC Men's Associate Cricketer of the Decade award.

In September 2021, Berrington was named the vice-captain of Scotland's provisional squad for the 2021 ICC Men's T20 World Cup.

Twenty20 franchise cricket
In June 2019, he was selected to play for the Edmonton Royals franchise team in the 2019 Global T20 Canada tournament. In July 2019, he was selected to play for the Glasgow Giants in the inaugural edition of the Euro T20 Slam cricket tournament. However, the following month the tournament was cancelled.

References

External links

1987 births
Living people
Cricketers from Pretoria
Scottish cricketers
Scotland One Day International cricketers
Scotland Twenty20 International cricketers
South African people of Scottish descent
South African people of British descent
Cricketers at the 2015 Cricket World Cup